The 1980 United States presidential election in Florida took place on Tuesday, November 4, 1980, as part of the 1980 United States presidential election in which all 50 states plus the District of Columbia participated. Florida voters chose 17 electors to represent them in the Electoral College via a popular vote pitting incumbent Democratic President Jimmy Carter and his running mate, Vice President Walter Mondale, against Republican challenger and former California Governor Ronald Reagan and his running mate and former Director of the CIA, George H.W. Bush.

The Republican ticket won Florida by a wide 17.02% margin, a particularly strong performance in this conservative leaning state that voted for Carter in 1976 by a 5.29% margin. John B. Anderson, a liberal Republican Congressman from Illinois who ran as an Independent with former U.S. Ambassador to Mexico Patrick Lucey, received his strongest performance of any former Confederate state in Florida, where he won 5.14% of the vote. Florida, along with Virginia, were one of only two southern states to give Anderson over 5% of the vote. Although Carter lost Florida, he is the last Democrat to win a majority of counties in the state's northern region. Carter is also the last Democrat to win the counties of Baker, Bradford, Columbia, Jackson, Lafayette, Liberty, Suwannee, and Union.  This cycle also marks the most recent time that an incumbent President standing for re-election would fail to carry Florida, irrespective of the national outcome. 

Reagan’s victory was the first of four consecutive Republican victories in the state, as Florida would not vote Democratic again until Bill Clinton won the state in his re-election bid in 1996. Whether Florida is a swing state or Republican-leaning red state today is disputed among political observers.

Results

Results by county

References

Flor
1980
1980 Florida elections